The Audi A1 (internally designated Typ 8X) is a supermini car launched by Audi at the 2010 Geneva Motor Show. Sales of the initial three-door A1 model started in Germany in August 2010, with the United Kingdom following in November 2010. A five-door version, called Sportback, was launched in November 2011, with sales starting in export markets during spring 2012.

Pre-production concepts

metroproject quattro (2007)

The A1 was previewed at the 2007 Tokyo Motor Show in the form of the Audi metroproject quattro concept car. The concept seats four and features a new plug-in hybrid powertrain. With this powertrain, a   Turbo FSI engine drives the front wheels via a six-speed S-Tronic, while a  electric motor provides power to the rear wheels. The electric motor is also capable of producing  of torque.

Audi A1 project quattro (2008)
At the 2008 Leipzig Auto Mobil International show, Audi again presented the metroproject quattro, renamed the A1 Project Quattro. The vehicle was designed by Audi AG Project Designer in Exterior Design Jürgen Löffler, who also presented the design during the car's Hong Kong debut.

A1 Sportback concept (2008)

The vehicle's  acceleration is 7.9 seconds and average CO2 emissions are given as 92g/km.

The vehicle was unveiled at the 2008 Paris Motor Show.

First generation (8X; 2010) 

The A1 three-door went on sale in most markets in late 2010 following the launch at Wörthersee Tour 2010, followed by the major public launch at the 2010 Paris Motor Show. The car is aimed mostly at young, affluent urban buyers.

A1 Sportback (2012–2018)
The five-door version of Audi A1, called "Sportback" by Audi, was unveiled at the 2011 Tokyo Motor Show.

Equipment
The A1 uses a MacPherson strut front and torsion beam rear suspension.

In the UK, the A1 trim levels are SE, Sport and S line. SE is the base specification, while Sport and S line models also have sport seats, sports suspension and larger wheels, amongst other features.

Engines

All engines will include a start-stop system and energy recuperation system except the versions with the  1.4 TFSI and the S Tronic version of the 1.6-litre TDI with 90 HP. 1.4-litre TFSI was sold as the 30 TFSI in China.

The production version of the A1 quattro was tested by Autocar magazine on MIRA's wet handling track alongside a Nissan GT-R; the A1 recorded lap time over five seconds faster than the GT-R. Autocar called the test a "...giant-killing result".

Safety
Euro NCAP tested Audi A1, Supermini 3-door Hatchback with front airbags, side airbags, seatbelt pretensioners and load limiters as standard and scored it accordingly:

Production
The A1 was produced at Audi's Belgian factory in Forest, near Brussels. The A1 is based on the Volkswagen Group PQ25 platform, the same platform used in the SEAT Ibiza Mk4 and the VW Polo Mk5, and in its development Audi has collaborated with SEAT. As of 23 June 2011, the 100,000th A1 was produced at Audi Brussels plant.

A version of 2011 Audi A1 painted by Damien Hirst was sold for £350,000.

Limited editions

A1 Motto Vehicles (2010)
A1 "Competition Kit" (Amalfi White) with 1.6 TDI engine, A1 "Follow Me" (Citrus Yellow) with 1.4 TFSI engine, A1 "Wasserwacht" (Suzuka Gray) with 1.4 TFSI engine, A1 "FC Bayern" (Misano Red) with 1.6 TDI engine, A1 "Pickerljäger" (Ibis White) with 1.6 TDI engine, A1 "Fashion" (Aubergine) with 1.6 TDI engine, A1 "Hot Rod" (Daytona Gray) with 1.4 TFSI were unveiled in Wörthersee Tour 2010.

A1 e-tron concept (2010)

The vehicle was unveiled at the 2010 Geneva Motor Show, followed by the 2012 Taipei Motor Show.

A1 e-tron

A field testing programme of twenty A1 e-tron vehicles began in Munich in late 2010.

In June 2012, the UK's Car Magazine reported that Audi had put the production version of the A1 e-tron on hold indefinitely in order to slim down its future electric vehicles plan. It was reported that, according to the director of e-mobility and sustainability strategy at Audi of America, the A1 e-tron had never been scheduled for production.

In March 2013, at the New York Auto Show, Audi announced it will be expanding the testing of its A1 E-tron outside of Munich to other regions of Germany.

Production of the A1 e-tron was reported to be cancelled.

A1 Competition Line, Contrast Edition (2011–)
Available in A1 1.4 TFSI (122PS) and 1.6 TDI (105PS), the A1 Competition Line is based on Sport trim (Sports seats, a leather multifunction steering wheel, Driver's Information System) for the UK market, inspired by the famous models from Audi's motorsport heritage, such as the Audi Quattro rally car. It included 18-inch 'Polygon' design alloy wheels, exterior styling package (front spoiler, double-blade roof spoiler, side skirts, rear diffuser in gloss black, stainless steel tailpipe trims), roof line, shoulder line with 'Audi Sport' lettering, number '1' on the bonnet and doors, boot lid, front spoiler lip, side skirts, wheel arch; surrounds and double-blade roof spoiler, rear sills with Audi rings, centre console trim, door handles, floor mats, rear-view mirror trim (not available with auto-dimming mirror), air vent sleeves in high gloss white.

The Contrast Edition is based on Sport trim (Sports seats, a leather multifunction steering wheel, Driver's Information System) for the UK market, with 17-inch '5-arm' design alloy wheels, exterior styling package (front spoiler lip, double-blade roof spoiler, side skirts, rear diffuser in gloss black, stainless steel tailpipe trims), roof contrast line, matching contrast on front spoiler lip, side skirts and double-blade roof spoiler.

The A1 Contrast Edition went on sale in summer 2011.

A1 Clubsport Quattro (2011)

This car is capable of  acceleration in 3.7 seconds.

The vehicle was unveiled in Wörthersee Tour 2011.

Parts shown in Audi A1 clubsport quattro were sold as part of the accessories program for the A1 family, with adhesive film decals in the contrasting colors Amalfi White, Ice Silver, metallic and Daytona Gray, pearl effect for the vehicles' shoulders available immediately. Other options included union square lifestyle kit (exterior decals and design elements for the interior, both with a diamond pattern), roof spoiler competition kit. The union square lifestyle kit are painted either in the body color or in a contrasting color.

2012 Audi A1 Contrast Edition, Black Edition (2011–)
The A1 Contrast Edition is available for all engines in the A1 Sport range except 1.4 TFSI 185PS for the UK market, with contrasting colour for the roof line and aerodynamic body styling elements (optional double-blade roof spoiler in a contrasting colour), 17-inch 'five-arm' design bi-colour alloy wheels.

The UK version of the A1 Black Edition is a version of the A1 1.4 TFSI (185PS) S line and 2.0 TDI (143PS) S line with black styling treatment for the single frame grille surround and number plate holder, dark tinted rear privacy glass, 18-inch five-arm rotor design alloy wheels in a titanium finish, Xenon Plus headlights with LED daytime-running lights, full electronic climate control 180-watt Audi Sound System speaker upgrade.

The Taiwan version of the A1 Black Edition is a limited (40 units) version of the A1 Ambition with high gloss front fascia with black fog lamp shade, 17-inch 5-spoke aluminium wheels, turbine design air conditioning vent sleeves in aluminium.

A1 Samurai Blue (2011–12)
The A1 Samurai Blue is a Japanese special edition model based on the 1.4 TFSI (122PS) 3-door unveiled at the 2011 Tokyo Motor Show. It is inspired by the Japanese national soccer team, with red 18-inch wheels with exclusive polygonal design, black interior equipment with contrasting stitching in blue, corresponding colour accents for air vent nozzles, inlays, center console and floor mats; sports suspension. Part of the profit will be donated for Japan Football Association revival fund. A further 111 models were released in 2012.

A1 Union Square (2012) 

This model is a special edition in America. The model is known for its prints, striking on the sides, trunk and lateral mirrors (wine color) in addition to its elegant finishes in air conditioning exits, door handles, center console and mats. matching the same prints that surround the car (in wine color).

This engine can be coupled to two options of gearbox, a S Tronic of 7 speeds, this last one counts in all the versions with pallets of changes behind the steering wheel. Its traction is forward.

A1 quattro (2012-13)

The vehicle went on sale in the second half of 2012.

A1 amplified, amplified plus, amplified advanced (2012–)
They are versions of the A1 and A1 Sportback based on the Ambition line, which is available for all engine versions of both models. The models combine exclusive optional features from Audi, quattro GmbH and Audi Genuine Accessories. The amplified red line and amplified white are in Misano Red pearl and Glacier White metallic body colours respectively.

The amplified model includes high-gloss black roof line, S line roof spoiler, exterior mirror housings and single-frame grille; 17-inch alloy wheels in five-arm design with black inserts, a matt transparent film for the engine hood, roof and rear hatch; air vent sleeves in the body color, black sport seats with stitching in Parade Red (amplified red) or Rock Gray (amplified white), floor mats with piping in matching colors.

The amplified plus model is based on the amplified, with black headliner, an LED interior light package, a color coordinated ignition key, center console and interior mirror housing in body color, stainless steel caps for the pedals and foot rest, aerodynamics competition kit in body color, LED taillights, high-gloss black diffuser insert integrating two matt black tailpipes on the left side (one tailpipe for engines up to 77 kW).

A1 Geoffy (2012–)
In 2012 there was a limited production run of the Ai Geoffy.  There are thought to only be a handful of these editions left on the road today.  This version of the A1 and A1 Sportback was available for all engine versions of both models. The models combine exclusive optional features from Audi.  All A1 Geoffies were produced with Glacier White metallic body colour.

The Geoffy model also includes high-gloss black roof line, S line roof spoiler, exterior mirror housings and single-frame grille; 17-inch alloy wheels in five-arm design with black inserts, a matt transparent film for the engine hood, roof and rear hatch and air vent sleeves in the body colour.

The other outstanding feature of the Geoffy was a revolutionary new smell, which was available to be refilled by cartridge and available to replace from Audi.  The scents available were fresh linen, Jasmin, week old wet washing and Cherry Blossom.

A1 e-tron German Olympic team car (2012)
It is a version of the A1 e-tron with German Olympic team colour scheme and decor, 20-spoke wheels.

The vehicle was unveiled in the London 2012 Summer Olympics and was used in the 2012 London Olympic games as shuttles between German House and MS Deutschland cruise ship.

A1 Competition Line exterior styling packages (2012–)
The A1 Competition Line exterior styling packages are based on the limited A1 Competition Line, available for the UK market. Competition Line plus exterior styling package is based on the A1 3-door, with foils with striking colouring on shoulder line with 'Audi Sport' lettering, wheel arch surrounds, roof line, boot lid with Audi chrome rings, Audi rings for side sills and Number '1' on the bonnet and doors.

A1 Huffer Edition (2013–)
It is a limited (15 units) version of the A1 Sport Plus for the New Zealand market, produced in association with Huffer clothing company. It included 1.4 TFSI (185PS) engine, choice of 3 body colours (black, red with black roof, white with black roof), racing-style bucket seats, interior fabrics in sprint cloth and black leather, suede-covered steering wheel, handbrake and gear selector; brushed aluminium inlays, MMI navigation system.

The vehicle went on sale in January 2013.

A1 China Limited Edition (2013–)
The A1 China Limited Edition is a limited (500 units) version of the Audi A1 30 TFSI Ego and A1 30 TFSI Ego plus for China market, with 1.4 TFSI (122PS) engine, 7-speed S tronic transmission, electronic anti-theft system, optional MMI Navigation plus with 20G hard disk space and simple voice input system, S line sporty chassis, sparkling red/white/gold three theme colors, 17-inch 5-spoke red/silver wheels, highlighted spraying red decorative trim for air vents, the central control board, inside rear-view mirror, door handles and other details are all decorated with Chinese elements. A1 30 TFSI Ego plus adds leather seats, tire pressure monitor, automatic air conditioner with rain sensor, Audi audio system, Bluetooth/Audi audio system connector, rain sensor for automatic anti-glare rear view mirror, xenon bulb with headlamp cleaner and LED tail lamps over A1 30 TFSI Ego.

A1 Sportback Urban Style Limited (2013–)
The Audi A1 Sportback Urban Style Limited (model DBA-8XCAX) is a limited (200 units) version of the right hand drive Audi A1 Sportback 1.4 TFSI (122PS) with 7-speed S tronic transmission for Japan market, with bi-xenon package (bi-xenon headlight, automatic headlight range control, headlight washer, rear LED combination lamp), exclusive brilliant black grille, exclusive brilliant black contrast roof, S-line roof spoiler in exclusive brilliant black, brilliant black door mirror cover, exclusive decorative film, air conditioning vent sleeve in exclusive glacier white, exclusive sport seat in Herzklopfen cloth upholstery in black with rock grey stitching, advance door key with body colour cover (glacier white), exclusive floor mat with grey piping and white stitching, exclusive 5-arm design 7.5Jx17-inch aluminium wheel with inner rim in high gloss black, 215/40R17 tires.

The vehicle went on sale in 2013-05-08.

A1 Sportback 'S line Competition' Limited Edition (2013–)
It is a limited (200 units) version of the Audi A1 Sportback S line for the Australian market, with 1.4 TFSI (122PS) engine, S tronic transmission, 17-inch alloy wheels in part-polished 5-spoke V design, front fog lights, LED tail lights, black exterior styling package, contrasting roof and roof arch, interior air vents in body colour, Audi parking system (rear), choice of 4 body colours (metallic colours Glacier White and Ice Silver, pearl effect colours Misano Red and Phantom Black).

A1 Sportback Lifestyle, A1 Competition Legends (2013–)
The A1 Sportback Lifestyle (時尚限量版) is a limited (76 units) version of the Audi A1 Sportback 1.4 TFSI with 7-speed S tronic transmission for Taiwan market, with stainless steel pedal, Lifestyle series floor mat, instrument panel black leather upholstery with white stitching (including steering wheel, hand brake, shifter knob), Lifestyle series centre console veneer, Audi exclusive aluminium alloy air conditioning vent sleeves, high gloss black side mirror cover.

The A1 Competition Legends (傳奇競速限量版) is a limited (4 units) version of the Audi A1 1.4 TFSI 7-speed S tronic transmission for Taiwan market, with stainless steel pedal, Legends series floor mat, Legends series leather shifter, Legends series hand brake cover, Legends series leather-wrapped steering wheel, Legends series centre console veneer, Legends series inner door veneer, Legends series air conditioning vent veneer, Audi Sport body decor.

A1 S line Style Edition, Black Edition (2013–)
Available for the A1 and A1 Sportback (1.2 TFSI 86PS, 1.4 TFSI 122PS and 1.6 TDI 105 PS), they are versions of the A1 S line for the UK market, with choice of 4 body colours (Ice Silver, Phantom Black, Misano Red or Glacier White colour) with metallic or pearl-effect paint finishes, gloss black finish (3-door) or fully gloss black (Sportback) contrasting roof line, gloss black door mirror housings, xenon headlamps with distinctive LED daytime running lights, Black styling package (a gloss finish for the single frame front grille surround, a matt black finish for the grille, fog light surrounds and number plate holder), 17-inch 'five V-spoke' or no-cost optional 'five-arm' design alloy wheels with a bi-colour finish, interior air vents sleeves in body colour (gloss black for Ice Silver and Phantom Black body colour car), part-leather sports seats, three-spoke S line sports steering wheel.

The Black Edition (available for 1.4 TFSI cylinder on demand, 1.4 TFSI (185PS), 2.0 TDI (143PS)) is based on S line trim level, with 18-inch titanium finish alloy wheels, 180-watt Audi sound system, privacy glass and electronic climate control.

A1 Urban Racer Limited, A1 Sportback Admired Limited (2013–)

The A1 Sportback admired limited (model DBA-8XCAX) is a limited (500 units) version of the right hand drive A1 1.4 TFSI (122PS) Sportback for Japan market, 7-speed S tronic transmission, with matt black single frame grille, S-line front bumper and roof spoiler, bi-xenon package, contrast roof, black door mirror housing, 17-inch aluminium wheel, checker black design floor mat, body colour air conditioning outlet, accented coloured sleeve, MMI 3G+navigation, choice of 4 body colours (Ice Silver, Glacier White, Misano Red, Phantom Black).

The vehicles went on sale on 29 October 2013.

A1 competition kits (2010–)
The A1 competition kits include adhesive film decals, vibrant paint finishes, exterior add-on parts, and a matching interior, available under the Audi Genuine Accessories (AOZ) program.

The 'competition kit Aerodynamic' includes a front spoiler lip, side sills, rear diffuser and – depending on the vehicle configuration – sport exhaust tips. Customers can also order a roof spoiler for the A1.

The 'competition kit legends interior plus' includes Amalfi White body colour, front spoiler lip and rear diffuser in Begonia Red, legends graphics with gloss-black Number 1 on the hood and the doors, decorative bezels for the rearview mirror, air vents, door pull handles, center console; black cloth floor mats with Begonia Red, Stone Gray and Gray Brown strips; color accent on the leather sport steering wheel, gear shift lever and parking brake lever.

The kits were available upon the vehicles' market launch.

Competition kit R18 (2013–)
Competition kit R18 is based on the look of Audi R18 e-tron quattro race car and has been reinterpreted for the Audi A1 as competition kit R18 gray and R18 red. A version of Audi A1 with competition kit R18 was unveiled in Wörthersee Tour 2013.

Motorsports
An A1 e-tron won the 2011 Silvretta Electric Car Rally.

Awards
The Audi A1 1.4 TFSI Sport was awarded "Car of the Year 2011" by the British What Car? magazine.

Marketing
As part of Audi A1 launch, Justin Timberlake became an Audi brand ambassador starting in 2010.

As part of Audi A1 launch, Audi Space became available for PlayStation Home, including a virtual Audi A1 showroom in 2010-02-11.

As part of Audi A1 launch, a free iPhone and iPod Touch rhythm driving game called 'Audi A1 Beat Driver' was released on 2010-04-19. The games features an international high score list, option for subscribing to a newsletter with the latest news and information about Audi A1, and nine different rock songs ("Accelerate" by Torpedo, "I'm A Rope" by Tommy Sparks, "Strength in Numbers" by The Music, "Farewell to the Fairground" by White Lies, "Gold Guns Girls" by Metric, "1989" by The Rakes, "Bulletproof" by La Roux, "Digital Age" by The Fall and "Want U" by Lo-Fi-Fnk). The updated iPhone & iPod touch version includes 8 new music tracks ("Gimme Sympathy" by Metric, "I'm Not Your Toy – Jack Beats Remix" by La Roux, "Love Affair Strapped in Electric Chair" by Torpedo, "Suburbia" by Spleen United, "Death" by White Lies, "Where I Belong (Life Is A Festival)" by Don Diablo, "Earthquake threat" by Torpedo, "A Funny Thing (Dan Grech Final Mix)" by Penguin Prison). iPad version includes 2 more new songs for total of 19 songs ("Self Machine" by I Blame Coco, "City Limits" by I Am Giant). The game was produced by Veemee.

Veemee produced Audi S1 Sledge video game for PlayStation 3, available via PlayStation Home. Updated version includes multiplayer support where player can race six players at one time with voice communication. Audi S1 sledge was designed by Miroslaw Leczek.

The Audi A1 has been promoted using a viral internet video release entitled "The Next Big Thing". The campaign stars Justin Timberlake and is comparable to the BMW film series "The Hire". Six episodes have been created and are available to view online. Each episode is around three minutes long, and shorter versions are featuring as television advertisements worldwide.

As part of Audi A1 launch in Taiwan, Ethan Juan became the Audi's Taiwan brand ambassador in 2011. As part of the deal, Audi supplied Juan Audi S4 as transport for 1 year.

As part of Audi A1 clubsport quattro premiere at Wörthersee Tour 2011 and Need for Speed World reaching 5 million registered users, the vehicle could be driven in Need for Speed World as a free in-game rental car between 2011-06-01 and 2011-06-04. The in-game vehicle was subsequently made available by using a redeem code as part of the game's 30 million registrations celebration. An updated version, called Audi A1 clubsport quattro Speed Edition, was available for 20 Audi Retweet contest winners hosted by Twitter between 2011-06-21 and 2011-06-26.

Philipp und Keuntje GmbH and Everybody All Together produced Audi A1 eCatalogue for Apple iPad, which allows the viewer to change the color of the car on almost every page, and included a 3D driving simulation.

As part of the A1 Sportback Urban Style Limited launch in Japan, an Audi A1 present campaign was held between 2013-06-07 and 2013-07-31, where an A1 Sportback Urban Style Limited was given away as A-prize.

A1 (Facelift 2015)

Second generation (GB; 2018)
The second generation A1 was launched in mid-June 2018. It is built on the MQB platform which is shared with the Volkswagen Polo Mk6 and the SEAT Ibiza Mk5.

This generation came to Mexico in 25 October 2019.

A1 Sportback (2018-)
European models went on sale in fall 2018, with ordering began in summer 2018.

A1 citycarver (2019-)
Black styling package includes gray lower body section, deep black stainless steel paint finish.

Ordering began in August 2019, and arrived at European dealerships in fall 2019.

In the UK, Audi removed the A1 citycarver from the range in 2021 due to slow sales.

In May 2022, the A1 citycarver is renamed A1 Allstreet (in reference to Audi Allroad range).

Engines
Unlike the predecessor, the second generation Audi A1 does not offer diesel engines but instead four petrol variants; The entry-level 25 TFSI (95PS), the 30 TFSI (116PS) with a 1.0 litre three-cylinder engine respectively, the 35 TFSI (150PS) with a 1.5-litre four-cylinder engine and the 40 TFSI (200PS) with a 2.0 litre four-cylinder engine along with 6-speed manual or 7-speed S tronic transmission. The 25 TFSI (95PS) is equipped with a 5-speed manual.

Equipment 
MMI radio and Audi smartphone interface which includes Apple CarPlay and Android Auto as standard, as well as a 10.25-inch infotainment touchscreen.

In the UK, the trim levels includes; SE, Sport and S line from the previous generation along with three new S Line trims; S Line Competition, S Line Contrast Edition and S Line Style Edition. SE is the base specification, while Sport and S line models includes have sport seats, sports suspension, exterior styling and larger wheels, as well as other features.

In 2021, S line competition package is available for Sportback 40 TFSI, 35 TFSI, 30 TFSI.

Production
In an interview by Automotive News Europe, Audi's CEO, Markus Duesmann, announced that once the second generation Audi A1's lifecycle ends, it will be discontinued with no successor, due to tighter European emissions standards, leaving the A3 as their entry-level model.

See also
Audi S1

References

External links

 Audi A1 Online Special
 Audi A1 project quattro (www.audi.com)

A1
Hatchbacks
Subcompact cars
Plug-in hybrid vehicles
2020s cars
Cars introduced in 2010
Cars powered by Wankel engines
Euro NCAP superminis
Front-wheel-drive vehicles
All-wheel-drive vehicles